James E. Newcom (August 29, 1905 – October 6, 1990) was an American film editor who had over 40 films during his long career.

Academy Awards
Newcom received one Academy Award and three further nominations in the category of Best Film Editing:

12th Academy Awards – Won for Gone with the Wind, shared with Hal C. Kern.
17th Academy Awards – Nominated for Since You Went Away with Hal C. Kern. Lost to Wilson.
23rd Academy Awards – Nominated for Annie Get Your Gun, lost to King Solomon's Mines.
43rd Academy Awards – Nominated for Tora! Tora! Tora! with Inoue Chikaya and Pembroke J. Herring. Lost to Patton.

Selected filmography

Tora! Tora! Tora! (1970)
The Impossible Years (1968)
Scent of Mystery (1960)
A Farewell to Arms (1957)
Prisoner of War (1954)
Rogue Cop (1954)
Scaramouche (1952)
Cause for Alarm! (1951)
Go for Broke! (1951)
The Law and the Lady (1951)
Westward the Women (1951)
Annie Get Your Gun (1950)
Key to the City (1950)
Right Cross (1950)
The Red Danube (1949)
Texas, Brooklyn & Heaven (1948)
Walk a Crooked Mile (1948)
Lured (1947)
Paris Underground (1945)
Guest in the House (1944)
Since You Went Away (1944)
Up in Arms (1944)
Cairo (1942)
Tortilla Flat (1942)
The Vanishing Virginian (1942)
The Chocolate Soldier (1941)
Topper Returns (1941)
Captain Caution (1940)
Rebecca (1940)
Gone with the Wind (1939)
The Prisoner of Zenda (1937)
A Star Is Born (1937)
The Murder Man (1935)

References

External links

Best Film Editing Academy Award winners
1905 births
1990 deaths
People from Indiana
American film editors